Selfie from Hell (marketed on home video as Selfie Man) is a 2018 Canadian horror film written and directed by Erdal Ceylan. It originally started as a short 2015 YouTube video with the same title. The film stars Alyson Walker, Tony Giroux, Meelah Adams, Ian Butcher, Tyler A.H. Smith, Shaun Morse, and Matthew Graham.

It was released on May 4, 2018 by Viva Pictures and received generally negative reviews.

Synopsis 
After her cousin comes to visit and falls ill, a woman starts to receive strange mobile phone messages.

Premise
Julia leaves Germany to visit her cousin Hannah. After Julia enters a coma, Hannah finds out about the shadowy figure that appears in her cousin's selfies and that she is dealing with a supernatural force from the dark web.

Cast 

 Alyson Walker as Hannah
 Tony Giroux as Trevor
 Meelah Adams as Julia
 Ian Butcher as F34R3473R
 Tyler A.H. Smith as Selfie Man
 Shaun Morse as Dr. Edwards
 Matthew Graham as Dr. Jonas

Release 
The film was released online on May 4, 2018 by Viva Pictures.

Reception
Chris Knight of the National Post gave a negative review stating, "The rambling plot dashes from one techno-fear to the next with barely time for its 30 or so jump-scares. Online videos! Blocked caller ID! Cracked screens! Red Rooms! Black Rooms!" Ken Eisner of The Georgia Straight also wrote a negative review stating, "At its most creative, Selfie hints at grisly abstractions recalling David Lynch and Under the Skin. But everything is so rushed, eros-free, and sketchy, the filmmakers must rely on booming sound effects and tired found-footage tropes to sell a story that, scarily enough, didn't quite make it out of screenwriting purgatory." Stuart Heritage of The Guardian wrote an article about this and similar horror films.

References

External links

2018 horror films
2015 YouTube videos
Canadian independent films
Canadian supernatural horror films
English-language Canadian films
Films about social media
2010s Canadian films